Juego de mentiras (English: Game of Lies) is an American television series that premiered on Telemundo on 7 March 2023. It is an original story created by Sebastián Arrau. It stars Arap Bethke, Altair Jarabo and María Elisa Camargo.

Plot 
The series revolves around the disappearance of Adriana Molina (María Elisa Camargo). Her husband, César Ferrer (Arap Bethke), is the prime suspect in the possible murder. To avoid losing his eight-year-old daughter, César investigates his wife's disappearance on his own. His search for clues to Adriana's disappearance leads him to discover that she had been living a double life and had a lover from a wealthy and powerful family.

Cast 
 Arap Bethke as César Ferrer
 Altair Jarabo as Camila del Río
 María Elisa Camargo as Adriana Molina
 Rodrigo Guirao as Francisco Javier del Río
 Cynthia Klitbo as Renata del Río
 Eduardo Yáñez as Pascual del Río
 Pepe Gámez as Jesús "Chuy" Marín
 Alberto Casanova as Elvis Barros
 Alicia Machado as Alejandra Edwards
 Beatriz Valdés as Elvira Gomez
 Gabriela Vergara as Eva Rojas
 Patricio Gallardo as Tomás del Río
 Bárbara Garofalo as Inés Urrutia
 María Laura Quintero as Linda Marquez
 Camila Nuñez as Noelia Ferrer

Guest stars 
 Aylín Mújica as Rocío Jimenez

Production

Development 
On 15 February 2022, the series was announced at Telemundo's virtual screening event with the working title Culpable o inocente. In May 2022, the series was presented during Telemundo's upfront for the 2022–2023 television season. On 13 August 2022, it was announced that the official title of the series would be Juego de mentiras. Filming of the series began on 15 August 2022 in Miami, United States, and concluded on 3 December 2022. On 26 January 2023, Telemundo released the first official trailer for the series.

Casting 
On 28 July 2022, Alicia Machado announced that she would be part of the main cast. On 13 August 2022, Arap Bethke, Altair Jarabo and María Elisa Camargo were announced in the lead roles, and an extensive cast list was published in a press release.

Ratings 
 
}}

Episodes

References

External links 
 

2023 telenovelas
2023 American television series debuts
Spanish-language American telenovelas
Spanish-language telenovelas
American telenovelas
Telemundo telenovelas
Telemundo original programming